A Girl in the River: The Price of Forgiveness is a 2015 documentary film directed by Sharmeen Obaid-Chinoy about honor killings in Pakistan. The film is produced by Tina Brown and Sheila Nevins in collaboration with HBO Documentary Films. A Girl in the River was edited by Geof Bartz, A.C.E.  The documentary was well received by critics and earned widespread critical acclaim. A Girl in the River was shortlisted with ten other documentaries from 74 entries submitted to 88th Academy Awards in Documentary Short Subject category, which it won.

Synopsis
The documentary follows the story of a nineteen-year-old girl, who survives an honor killing attempt by her father and uncle. The protagonist has a solid stance on not forgiving her attackers; however, the public pressures her into forgiving. By doing that, the attackers are freed and can return home.

Release
The film was released on October 28, 2015, and had its worldwide premiere on HBO on March 7, 2016.

Reaction
The movie gained a mixed reaction in Pakistan.

It won the Oscar for Best Documentary and convinced the Pakistani government to review its laws on honor killings.

Awards and nominations

References

External links

 
 A Girl in the River: The Price of Forgiveness on HBO
 

2015 short documentary films
2010s American films
Best Documentary Short Subject Academy Award winners
Documentary films about honor killing
Films directed by Sharmeen Obaid-Chinoy
HBO documentary films
Pakistani short documentary films